The Puyuma Express is a type of railway service on Taiwan Railways (TRA) notable for using tilting trains. It began commercial service on 6 February 2013 during the Spring Festival.

Puyuma Express was commissioned by the TRA in order to upgrade the Taiwanese rail system. As the mountains of Taiwan are a barrier to coast-to-coast transportation, motor travel is prone to congestion. The high speed and capacity of the service helps to alleviate this problem. Puyuma Express also increases passenger capacity on TRA. Puyuma Express belongs to the Tze-chiang limited express class of TRA services in terms of fares; however, it is a reservation-only service similarly to the Taroko Express, with no standing passengers allowed.

Naming 
The name "Puyuma" means "together" and "united" in the Puyuma language spoken by the Puyuma people of eastern Taiwan. It was chosen after a naming contest that was open to the public.

History 
The trains were imported to Taiwan in 2012; since 2013, they have been running between Hualien and Taipei, on the existing narrow gauge tracks of the winding Yilan line, where they reduced traveling time between the two cities from 3 hours down to about 2 hours. On 28 February 2013, the TRA announced that Taitung would become a destination on the Puyuma Express with official operations beginning 16 July 2014, in concord with the completion of electrification of the Taitung Line.

Rolling stock 
Puyuma Express services use TEMU2000 series tilting EMUs purpose-built by Nippon Sharyo. TRA purchased a total of 152 TEMU2000 cars for 19 trains. The first 16 cars arrived on 25 October 2012.

Fatal incidents 
 On 21 October 2018, Puyuma Express set 4 derailed in Yilan County at about 16:50 local time, killing at least 18 people and injuring 187. The cause of this incident was an excessive speed, combined with an inactive automatic train stop.

References 

Electric multiple units of Taiwan
Tilting trains
2003 introductions
2003 establishments in Taiwan

25 kV AC multiple units
Nippon Sharyo multiple units